Cansever is a Turkish name. It is a combination of the words can, meaning "life" (loaned from Persian jan) and sever, which means "love". It may refer to:

 Edip Cansever (1928–1986), Turkish poet
 Fahrettin Cansever (1930–1987), Turkish footballer
 Turgut Cansever (1921–2009), Turkish architect

Turkish feminine given names